Barnsbury is an area of north London in the London Borough of Islington, within the N1 and N7 postal districts.

The name is a syncopated form of Bernersbury (1274), being so called after the Berners family: powerful medieval manorial lords who gained ownership of a large part of Islington after the Norman Conquest. The area of Barnsbury was predominantly rural until the early nineteenth century.

By the end of the 18th century, however, Barnsbury, like other parts of Islington, was being regarded as attractive part-rural suburbs by the comparatively wealthy people wanting to move out of the cramped City of London and industrial Clerkenwell.  The area is close to the city, and had strong local trade in its position as the first staging post for travellers making the journey from London to the north, and with considerable agricultural traffic and cattle driving to the nearby Smithfield cattle market in the city.

Barnard Park, consisting of 10 acres including a large area of football pitches, was created in 1967 on an area of housing that had been bombed during World War Two and named after former Islington Mayor Cllr George Barnard.

Pentonville Prison (built 1842) is located within Barnsbury.

Since 2006, Barnsbury ward has been represented by three Labour councillors.

Notable people 
 Gillian Anderson (born 1968), actress, activist and writer
 Michael Faraday (1791–1867), chemist
 Owen Jones (born 1984), Labour activist
 Enid Marx (1902–1998) painter and designer, known for industrial textile designs for the London Transport Board and the Utility furniture Scheme.
 Ivor Moreton (1908–1984), pianist and singer, born in Barnsbury
 Grayson Perry (born 1960), artist
 Emily Thornberry (born 1960), Labour Party MP for Islington South and Finsbury 
 Phoebe Waller-Bridge (born 1985), actress and writer

Nearest stations 
 Caledonian Road & Barnsbury Overground station
 Angel tube station
 Caledonian Road tube station
 Highbury and Islington station

Nearby areas

References

 
Districts of the London Borough of Islington
Areas of London